Christel Peters (15 January 1916 – 11 June 2009) was a German actress.

Biography 
Peters was born in Swinemünde, Germany (now Świnoujście, Poland) as a child of an actor's family and started to appear on a stage in the age of four.
Peters worked at several stages and became known to a wider audience after the German reunification by several TV productions and especially through her appearance as the "Mother of all bargains" (Mutter aller Schnäppchen) in an advertising campaign.

Selected filmography
 Nightshapes (1999)
  (2000)
 Vaya con Dios (2002)
 Summer in Berlin (2005)

References

External links
 
 

1916 births
2009 deaths
People from Świnoujście
German television actresses
German stage actresses
People from the Province of Pomerania
20th-century German actresses
21st-century German actresses